Terrell High School is a public high school located in the city of Terrell, Texas, USA and newly classified as a 5A school by the UIL.  It is a part of the Terrell Independent School District located in northwest Kaufman County.   In 2013, the school was rated "Met Standard" by the Texas Education Agency.

Athletics
The Terrell Tigers compete in volleyball, cross country, football, basketball, powerlifting, soccer, golf, tennis, track, baseball, and softball.

State titles
 Boys Golf, 2A conference (1958–1959 academic year)
 Boys Track & Field, 3A conference (1979–1980 academic year)

Notable alumni

References

External links
 

public high schools in Texas
schools in Kaufman County, Texas